Aki Seiuli (born 22 December 1992) is a New Zealand born rugby union player of Samoan heritage who currently plays as a prop for Dragons and the Samoan national side. He previously played for Glasgow Warriors; and the New Zealand sides  - in domestic Mitre 10 Cup - and the  - in the international Super Rugby competition.

Rugby Union career

Amateur career

Born in Christchurch on New Zealand's South Island, Seiuli moved to the town of Timaru, which lies roughly halfway between Christchurch and Dunedin, in 2002 and attended Timaru Boys' High School there.   He captained the school's first XV rugby side in his final year before going on to play once for South Canterbury in the Heartland Championship while he was still a college student.   He later moved to Otago and turned out for the Taieri Eels with whom he won the Dunedin Premier Club Championship in 2012.

Professional career

Success in local club rugby saw Seiuli earn a spot in the Otago squad for the 2012 ITM Cup. He once again featured 7 times in 2013, with every appearance from the replacements bench before becoming much more of a regular in 2014. Injury to fellow loosehead Craig Millar meant that he started all 10 of Otago's games in what proved to be a difficult year which ended up with them finishing in 6th place on the championship log and missing out on the playoffs completely.

Seiuli was not named in any of the five New Zealand Super Rugby franchise's squads ahead of the 2014 Super Rugby season, however an injury crisis in the Highlanders front row saw him called into their set-up to provide short-term cover.

Seiuli once again found himself in the Super Rugby wilderness in 2015 before injuries once again provided him with an opportunity in 2016. A season-ending injury suffered by Brendon Edmonds in April 2016 saw Seiuli brought in as back up to Daniel Lienert-Brown and Craig Millar.

Tony Brown replaced the  bound Jamie Joseph as Highlanders head-coach ahead of the 2017 Super Rugby season and having worked with Seiuli before at provincial level, he saw fit to promote him to the franchise's senior squad ahead of his first campaign in charge.

On 11 September 2019, Seiuli moved to Scotland to sign for Glasgow Warriors in the Pro14 competition from the 2019-20 season. Seiuli stated: "Glasgow play a great brand of rugby, and that really drew me here. I’m really looking forward to getting out in front of the crowd here at Scotstoun. Hearing them at the Sale Sharks game was awesome – they’re on another level, and the atmosphere was incredible." He made his competitive debut for the Warriors on 30 November 2019, becoming Glasgow Warrior No. 308. Of the Glasgow move he told the Warrior Nation in a Q & A: "I’m loving it. The team is a great bunch of guys and the fans have been so welcoming since I came to Glasgow." He was nominated for the Glasgow Warriors Player of the Season award in 2019-20.

On 20 July 2021 he signed with Dragons.

Super Rugby Statistics

International career

On 29 May 2021 Seiuli was named in the Samoa international squad - alongside his then team-mate at Glasgow Warriors, TJ Ioane - to play the Maori All Blacks and Tonga in the summer of 2021. Both Seiuli's parents are Samoan, and his father was reportedly very keen for his son to represent Samoa.

References

1992 births
Living people
New Zealand rugby union players
New Zealand sportspeople of Samoan descent
Rugby union props
South Canterbury rugby union players
Otago rugby union players
Highlanders (rugby union) players
Rugby union players from Timaru
People educated at Timaru Boys' High School
Glasgow Warriors players
Dragons RFC players
Samoan rugby union players
Samoa international rugby union players